Mark Strickson (born 6 April 1959) is a British TV producer and actor best known for his acting role as the character of Vislor Turlough, a companion of the Fifth Doctor, on the television series Doctor Who.

Early life

Strickson was born in Stratford-upon-Avon, England. He attended King Edward VI Grammar School in his home town, the same school as William Shakespeare, and was also a chorister at Holy Trinity Church (Shakespeare's Church), where his father, John Strickson, was organist and choirmaster. He studied drama at RADA in London. After he left Doctor Who, Strickson emigrated to Australia, where he studied zoology at the Armidale campus of the University of New England, part-funding his education by teaching theatre studies for 5 years. He subsequently relocated to Dunedin, New Zealand, where he took up residence.

Career

As an actor, he appeared in the BBC medical series Angels before landing his part in Doctor Who, in which he starred for two years. He also played the young Ebenezer Scrooge in the 1984 version of A Christmas Carol.

Strickson subsequently became a documentary producer and director, especially of wildlife documentary programmes. He has produced programmes for, amongst others, the Discovery Channel, the BBC, ITV, Channel 4 and Animal Planet. It was he who, in this capacity, brought Steve Irwin, the "Crocodile Hunter", to public attention with such shows as The Ten Deadliest Snakes in the World.

Strickson appeared at Doctor Who 20th-anniversary celebrations in Longleat in 1983 alongside many other cast and crew members from the series. He has reprised the role of Turlough in the Big Finish Productions Doctor Who audio dramas. He has also contributed interviews and voiceover commentaries for DVD releases of his various Doctor Who serials.

Filmography

Television

Video games

References

External links

1959 births
20th-century English male actors
Alumni of RADA
British expatriate male actors in Australia
British expatriate male actors in New Zealand
English documentary filmmakers
English expatriates in Australia
English expatriates in New Zealand
English male television actors
English television directors
English television producers
Living people
Actors from Dunedin
People from Stratford-upon-Avon
University of New England (Australia) alumni